Portugalete is a station on line 2 of the Bilbao metro. It is located in central Portugalete. Opening on 20 January 2007, it acted as the northern terminus of the line until the line was extended to Santurtzi.

There is a station on the Cercanías Bilbao commuter railway network with the same name, but the two stations are not connected.

Station layout 

Portugalete station follows the typical cavern-shaped layout of most underground Metro Bilbao stations designed by Norman Foster, with the main hall located directly above the rail tracks.

Access 

  19 Carlos VII Av. (Carlos VII exit)
  22 Maestro Zubeldia St. (Maestro Zubeldia exit, closed during night time services)
   Ferdinand Arnodin St.

Services 
The station is served by line 2 from Basauri to Kabiezes. The station is also served by Bizkaibus regional bus services.

References

External links
 

Line 2 (Bilbao metro) stations
Railway stations in Spain opened in 2007
2007 establishments in the Basque Country (autonomous community)